William Hoy may refer to:
 Dummy Hoy (William Ellsworth Hoy), American center fielder in Major League Baseball
 William Hoy (film editor), active since 1988 with over two dozen feature-film editing credits
 William Edwin Hoy, Protestant missionary and educator in Japan and China
 Will Hoy, English racing driver